Aeropelican Air Services Pty Ltd was a regional airline based in Newcastle, New South Wales, Australia. Its main base was Newcastle Airport, with a hub at Sydney Airport.

History 

The airline was established on 23 October 1968 and started operations on 1 July 1971 with a Cessna 402. It originally was owned by the Newcastle-based Hilder family, however in 1980 the airline was sold to Masling Airlines, a company associated with the now-defunct Ansett Australia. It operated services for Ansett Australia and later became a wholly owned subsidiary.

Aeropelican's main route was historically between Sydney and Belmont Airport in Newcastle's southern suburbs, with high frequency service using de Havilland Canada DHC-6 Twin Otters. Aeropelican originally owned this airport.

Following the collapse of parent company Ansett Australia in September 2001, Aeropelican was placed into administration. It was acquired by International Air Parts in April 2002. On 20 June 2003 the airline entered into a commercial agreement with Regional Express Airlines. 

Aeropelican commenced services from Sydney to Newcastle's other airport (Williamtown, to the north of the city) on 1 March 2004. An Embraer Bandeirante started services from Williamtown on 20 September 2004 to augment the two Twin Otters used before. In March 2005 the airline discontinued service from Belmont Airport. A Fairchild Metro 23 aircraft was also added to the fleet in 2005 and the Twin Otters were withdrawn. In 2006, three BAe Jetstream 32s were ordered, with plans to announce new services. In December 2006, Aeropelican was awarded the Sydney to Inverell route licence after the previous operator Big Sky Express ceased operations. After the first two Jetstream 32s were placed into service in 2007, the Metro was withdrawn from service. In December 2007 Aeropelican announced that, subject to regulatory approval, it would commence operations between Newcastle and Tamworth, New South Wales on 12 February 2008. The airline subsequently received regulatory approval from the Civil Aviation Safety Authority and commenced operations on the route, however the following September it ceased flights to Tamworth, citing poor passenger numbers on the route.

Also in 2008 International Air Parts sold the airline to Business Air Holdings.

Brindabella Airlines merger and demise
In October 2011, it was announced by Aeropelican's Chief Commercial Officer, Fabrice Binet, that Canberra-based regional operator Brindabella Airlines would merge with Aeropelican, following the withdrawal of Brindabella's majority shareholder. It was speculated that this merger would add two BAe Jetstream 41 and three Metroliner III turboprops to Aeropelican's fleet.  Aeropelican did hint however, that at least one of the BAe Jetstream 41 turboprops would service the Sydney to Cooma–Snowy Mountains Airport route during the 2012 Ski Season. These flights ran from 8 June to 8 September in the 2012 ski season.
The end of Aeropelican trading under its own name was 24 June 2013. The merger complete, all flights operated using Brindabella's designator FQ and the former Aeropelican fleet was to be rebranded.

Following a series of groundings of Brindabella's aircraft by the Civil Aviation Safety Authority due to overdue engine inspections and maintenance in November and December 2013, the airline was forced to suspend all flying operations, then was placed in receivership on 15 December.

On 23 December 2013 it was announced that most of the 140 employees would be retrenched, with a dozen kept on to maintain the aircraft.

The airline FlyPelican was formed by former Aeropelican staff using former Aeropelican aircraft.

Destinations 

As of April 2012, scheduled services were operated on the following routes:

 Sydney to Mudgee
 Sydney to Narrabri
 Sydney to Newcastle 
 Brisbane to Narrabri

Fleet 

As of December 2012 the Aeropelican fleet consisted of:

 3 BAe Jetstream 32
 2 Fairchild Swearingen Metroliner
 3 Embraer EMB 110 Bandeirante

FlyPelican
Some of the staff involved with Aeropelican formed FlyPelican in 2015, using former Aeropelican aircraft.

See also
 List of defunct airlines of Australia
 Aviation in Australia

References
Notes
1.  Aeropelican has been approved by Airservices Australia to use the designator of "PE" for its flights instead of using aircraft registrations.

External links

Official website
Aeropelican Information

Defunct airlines of Australia
Airlines established in 1968
Airlines disestablished in 2013
Ansett Australia
Air transport in the Hunter Region
Former Star Alliance affiliate members
Australian companies established in 1968